Villa Insurgentes, better known as (El Calabazal) is a town located in the municipality of Sombrerete (in the state of Zacatecas). There are 2,837 inhabitants; it is 2150 meters in elevation.
The area around Villa Insurgentes has a small population, with 16 people per square kilometer.  The nearest city is Vicente Guerrero 14.5 km west.

History 
El Calabazal was founded in the year 1555 – 1595 by a group of Realists guided by Juan de Salas and Bernardino de Salas at an important time in the state's history. It is not known if the two men were related.

Bearing the image of Saint Joseph (San José in Spanish), the Cristelos founded the church between 1801 and 1818. which was made of stone and its earth roof which was supported with wood made of wood was swallowed to the community with their own hands built of pines that cut from the hill.  They also created the first cemetery in the municipality of Sombrerete, which quickly filled up so that the bodies were removed with some time buried to put new ones.  In 1975 the former archbishop of Duran Mons, Antonio López Aviña, decided to expand the San José del Calabazal Parish (Saint Joseph Calabazal Parish) which was very small. To not destroy the old parish, he added it to the front of the existing one.  Not only does it have its parish, it also has an old cross on the top of the hill that was placed in 1940 which was named De la Santa Cruz Misionera because it was blessed by a Missionary priest who came to town, being his celebration is the May 22 with its traditional dance, mañanitas and relic in the Parras neighborhood.  In 1972 another holy cross was made in the neighborhood of La Laguna which is celebrated on May 2 by all the masons of the community with dance, gunpowder, relic, mass, and their rosary.

Christ the King was made by a priest, son of a defender of the faith, Pablo Aurelio, rooms on September 20, 1961, and that same day they celebrate it with music, mass, rockets.  By the year of 1952 the name of the community was changed to  'Villa Insurgentes' , which is what it currently has.

Pantheon (Old) is the oldest pantheon in Villa Insurgentes according to the tomas, the oldest is by María de los Ángeles Ibarra de Saucedo who died on December 8, 1910. Although it cannot be older since they took out the dead to put New bodies

Culture and holidays 
A party is held every year employer in honor of San José starting on March 10 and ending on the 22nd of March.  It begins with the pilgrimage for nine days with floats, dance, rosary and mass.  On March 17, the coronation of the queen, charreada and colleague is made. On the 19th, the mornings are made in addition to dance, mass, rosary, dance, coleaderos, horseback riding, gunpowder, relic, mechanical games and vintage stalls.  In Holy Week a traditional  viacrucis  is made from San José del Calabazal Parish to the Holy Missionary Cross where it is crucified Jesus of Nazareth.  In the town and the neighboring communities that compose it there is an image of Santo Niño de Atocha created in the town of Villa Insurgentes since March 19, 1993.  house by house 365 days a year where a rosary is made and people are given a relic.  As the parties approach in the city of Plateros, Fresnillo, people come with the same image that walks through the houses to the Sanctuary of Plateros which is a Catholic sanctuary of Mexico where the small image of Santo Niño de Atocha is venerated.  Plateros is 5 km from Fresnillo, Zacatecas, only separated by the Mexico – Ciudad Juárez highway.

Religion 

As of 2016, Catholics form 75% of the community.  Villa Insurgentes is the seat of the Catholic diocese.  The first church of Villa Insurgentes is San José del Calabazal Parish Church which is located on the Avenue Moleros.

Other religions 
 Baptists 5% 
 Judaism 2%
 Buddhists 3%
 Jehovah's Witnesses 5%
 Satanic 5% 
 No beliefs 3% 
 Other 2%

Climate 
The weather in the city of Villa Insurgentes El Calabazal is cool most of the year.
 

Spring temperatures range between 15 °C (min) and 26 (max) and 7 and 10 Cº (min) between March and April.  The first months of summer reaches up to 35 Cº.  While, in July and August, when the rains increase (750 mm approx.) The temperature ranges between 13 °C (min) and 28 °C.  5th (max).  In autumn, temperatures range between 8 and 11 °C (min) and 18 and 20 °C (max).  In winter, temperatures range between 0 (in 2006 -6 °C) and 18 °C (max.). Conditions become more benevolent until the end of February.  The cold climate is due to the elevation of the municipality (2300 mSNM), although in the highest parts of Cerro El Papantón they are constant in the months of December and January and temperatures of up to −10 °C.  The hottest month is May with more than 24 °C, and the coldest month is January, with 12 °C.  The average rainfall is 608 mm per year.  The rainiest month is September with 150 mm of rain, and the driest month is March, with 1 mm of rain.

Hydrography 
The main water currents of the Town are Arroyo Grande and it has other smaller ones that are Las Cañadas and Arroyo Barbecho.

Flora and fauna 
Villa Insurgentes, because it is located the part corresponding to Sierra Madre Occidental, this place represents refuge for some animal species of which some are endemic to the area.  The fauna is characteristic of the coniferous forests in its high parts, and of grasslands, scrub dry weather plants.  The Sierra de Órganos National Park is 27.59 km from insurgent village.

The coniferous species found in Villa Insurgentes are diverse, of which are: pine pine, oak.  Other species of trees and plants are: palm, huizache, maguey, nopal duraznillo, nopal cap, brush, oregano, manzanita, gatuño, jarilla, sotol, biznaga, guayabillo, capulín, tepozán and chives.

Some species of animals are typical of the fauna that makes up the region, although there are endemic species.  Common species that can be found at the site are: dura scorpion, field mouse, rattlesnake, alicante, bats, hare, paloma huilota, scaled quail, white-winged pigeon, calandria, raccoon, wild boar, gray fox, rabbit, coyote, tlacuache, badger, wildcat, skunk, spotted owl, lizards, spiders.  dragonflies, damselflies, grasshopper, crickets, butterflies, flies, mosquitos, mantis, ladybugs.  bees, wasps, ants, moisture mealybugs, and centipede.

Domestic fauna 
Domestic fauna, or domesticated fauna, is constituted by the domestic species themselves, that is, those species subject to the domination of man, who are habituated to live under this domain without being locked or subject and in this state they reproduce indefinitely, with this domain as an objective the exploitation of the ability of various animals to produce work, meat, eggs, and other products and services (horse, bulls, cow, Sheep, Goat, cat, dog, Hen, pig, donkey.).

Composition of Ejido Villa Insurgente 
It is made up of the towns of Ojo de Agua, Santa Rita, Salas Pérez, San José de las Corrientes, Pompeii, San Francisco de Órganos, Providencia, Agua Zarca, San Francisco de las Flores, the Alamo, San Juan de los Laureles, San José  by Felix, Doroteo Arango, Alfredo V. Bonfil.  Al Ejido It also belongs Sierra de Órganos National Park

Founded communities 
These communities were founded by people from  'Villa Insurgentes El Calabazal' 
 The Jewel, Dgo
 Child Gunner, zac
 Salas Pérez, zac
 Saint Joseph of the currents, Dgo
 Santa Rita, zac
 Eye of water, zac

Economic activities 
Its activities are:
 Farming
 Livestock
 Commerce

On Saturday January 13, 2018, the traditional tianguis began in the center of Villa insurgentes, which has had very good acceptance by people from both the community and the arelañas communities.  There is the sale of fruits and vegetables, clothing, Mexican snacks, sweets, music records, etc.  At a great price And that helps the economy of the community.

Education 
In Villa Insurgentes  there are 70 illiterates whose ages range from 15 years and over; 16 inhabitants between 6 and 14 do not attend school.  Of the population from 15 years old, 72 have no schooling, 706 have an incomplete schooling.  165 have a basic education and 134 have a post-basic education.

A total of 71 inhabitants, young people between 15 and 24 years old, have attended school; The average schooling of the population is 6 years.  Since 1980, it has the kindergarten Gabino Barreda, a rural primary school with the name of La Corregidora, Technical Secondary School No. 30 Moisés Sanz and the High school / Baccalaureate distance from the State of Zacatecas, which is affiliated with the baccalaureate system of the National Autonomous University of Mexico within its distance modality.

Health 
Villa Insurgentes Health Center' '' is a Rdar clinic that has a female doctor and a nurse and offers services from Monday to Friday of 8 a.  m.  to 2 p.  m.  and has a pharmacy.

 Population 
In the town there are 629 men and 726 women.  The female / male ratio is 2,209, and the fertility rate is 3.19 children per woman.  Of the total population, 26.35% comes from outside the State of Zacatecas.  3.54% of the inhabitants are illiterate (3.82% of the men, and 3.31% of the women).  The level of schooling is 6.46 (6.71 in men and 6.24 in women).

0.00% of the population is indigenous.  0.01% of the population speaks an indigenous language and does not speak Spanish.

26.94% of the inhabitants (more than 12 years) are economically active (48.01% of the men, and 8.68% of the women).

 Municipal delegates 

 Tourist attractions 
 San José del Calabazal Parish
 Employer Fair (FPVI)
 Holy Week
 holy cross missionary
 Christ the King
 Santa Cruz Masons
 plaza el salvador
 Humberto serrano Ibarra Public Library
 Pantheon (Old)

 Reynas of the Villa Insurgentes Fair (FPVI) 

 Distinguished characters 
 Juan De Salas.  Founder of Villa Insurgentes (the pumpkin) 1555 – 1595
 Bernandino De Salas Founder of Villa Insurgentes (the gourd) 1555 – 1595
Catholics
 Antonio López Aviña Reconstruction of the San José del Calabazal Parish December 21, 1975
Gilberto Gaucin

 Villa Insurgentes Media 

 TV 

 Radio Amplitud ModuladaFrecuencia Modulada'''

Road 
 Federal Highway 45
 López Mateos
 Constitution
 Corrector
 Cesar Lopez de Lara Boulevard
 Moleros
 Zarco
 Principal

Public services

Means of transport 

Villa Insurgentes has two urban trucks that pass through its main streets and the communities of the Ojo de Agua metropolitan area, Santa rita, Salas Pérez.

Route 1, from 7: 00 – 8:30 in the morning and at 1: 30–4: 30 in the afternoon, from Monday to Friday and on Saturdays and Sundays from 8: 30–9: 30 in the morning 1:  30 to 2:30 in the afternoon.  This city bus owes the people shopping to the neighboring municipality of Vicente Guerrero and also the students of High School Cobaed and Cebetis

Route 2
This bus passes at the time of 6: 30–7: 00
in the morning and return at 3:30 pm Monday through Friday (Only in Villa Insurgentes) goes to the neighboring municipality of Sombrerete.  Must students at High School Cobaso and shopping passengers.

Taxis

References

Citations

Notes

Municipalities of Zacatecas